A list of films produced in Russia in 2010 (see 2010 in film).

2010

See also
 2010 in Russia

External links

2010
Films
Russia
2010 in Russian cinema